Rajender Singh (born 23 January 1969) is an Indian-American entrepreneur, author, and founder of entrepreneurial set-up Star promotion Inc. He has organized many Bollywood events in Houston, US. He represented Houston at the IIFA Awards.

On his recent visit to India, he paid a courtesy call on the vice-president of India Jagdeep Dhankar, Minister of State for Parliamentary Affairs & Culture Arjun Ram Meghwal, Governor of Odisha Ganeshi Lal, Chief Minister of Odisha Naveen Patnaik.

Singh moved to US and began his career in event management and star promoter with big Bollywood celebrities. He has organized the notable events like Kucch Bhi Ho Sakta Hai, Hindi play Mera Woh Matlab Nahi Tha with Anupam Kher, Unforgettable with Amitabh Bachchan, SLAM The Tour with Shahrukh Khan, Deepika Padukone, Abhishek Bachchan and Farah Khan. He has spread the Indian culture and heritage through over 95 major Bollywood events.

Singh is the author of the book Vatan Se Door.

Controversy 
In February 2022, singer Sonu Nigam claimed that Singh sent derogatory and slanderous messages to him and working with Anti-National eliments. But Pahl said that this claim is baseless.

Philanthropy 
Singh has been consistently providing help to save lives in India since the onset of the COVID-19, shipping over 200 oxygen concentrators, 50 oxygen cylinders and several oximeters to India.

References

American writers of Indian descent
American businesspeople
Living people
1969 births
People from Rajasthan